Sepia faurei is a species of cuttlefish native to the southwestern Indian Ocean, specifically to the east of the Cape of Good Hope, South Africa. It lives at depths to 168 m.

Sepia faurei grows to a mantle length of 21 mm.

The type specimen was collected 88 km southeast of Cape Seal, South Africa. It is deposited at the South African Museum in Cape Town.

References

External links

Cuttlefish
Molluscs described in 1972